Herbert Rothwell  (born 1880) was an English footballer. His regular position was at full back. He was born in Manchester. He played for Manchester United, Newton Heath Athletic, Glossop North End, and Manchester City.

External links
MUFCInfo.com profile

1880 births
English footballers
Manchester United F.C. players
Glossop North End A.F.C. players
Manchester City F.C. players
Association football defenders
Year of death missing